The USRA Light Santa Fe was a USRA standard class of steam locomotive designed under the control of the United States Railroad Administration, the nationalized railroad system in the United States during World War I.  These locomotives were of 2-10-2 wheel arrangement in the Whyte notation, or 1′E1′ in UIC classification; this arrangement was commonly named "Santa Fe" in the United States.  At the time, the Santa Fe was the largest non-articulated type in common use, primarily in slow drag freight duty in ore or coal service.

A total of 94 of these locomotives were constructed under the auspices of the USRA.  They went to the following railroads:

Only one USRA Light 2-10-2 survives: DM&IR 506 is on display at the National Railroad Museum in Green Bay, Wisconsin

References

2-10-2 locomotives
USRA locomotives
ALCO locomotives
Baldwin locomotives
Freight locomotives
Standard gauge locomotives of the United States
Railway locomotives introduced in 1918